The following is a list of notable deaths in November 2002.

Entries for each day are listed alphabetically by surname. A typical entry lists information in the following sequence:
 Name, age, country of citizenship at birth, subsequent country of citizenship (if applicable), reason for notability, cause of death (if known), and reference.

November 2002

1
Ekrem Akurgal, 91, Turkish archaeologist.
Yisrael Amir, 99, Israeli Air Force commander.
David Bartleet, 73, British Anglican prelate, Bishop of Tonbridge.
Edward Brooke, 85, Canadian Olympic fencer (1952 Summer Olympics: men's foil, men's épée).
Nicholas John Bua, 77, American judge (U.S. District Judge of the U.S. District Court for the Northern District of Illinois).
Amadou Cissé Dia, 87, Senegalese politician and playwright.
Käte Jaenicke, 79, German theater and film actress.
Lester Morgan, 26, Costa Rican professional football goalkeeper, suicide.
Keith A. Wester, 62, American sound engineer (The Rock, Air Force One, Armageddon).
Sir Charles Wilson, 93, British political scientist.

2
Brian Behan, 75, Irish writer and playwright, younger brother of Brendan Behan.
Robert Haslam, Baron Haslam, 79, British industrialist and life peer.
Lo Lieh, 63, Hong Kong actor.
Dame Felicity Peake, 89, British Director of the Women's Royal Air Force.
Tonio Selwart, 106, Bavarian actor and Broadway performer.
Charles Sheffield, 67, English-born American science fiction author and physicist.
Richard F. Visotcky, 73, American politician, member of the New Jersey General Assembly.

3
Mary Bird, 92, American Olympic alpine skier (women's combined alpine skiing at the 1936 Summer Olympics).
Lonnie Donegan, 71, British skiffle musician ("Rock Island Line", "John Henry").
Sir John Habakkuk, 87, British economic historian.
Jonathan Harris, 87, American actor (Lost in Space, A Bug's Life, The Third Man).
William Packard, 69, American poet and author.
Sir Rex Roe, 77, British air force officer.

4
Antonio Margheriti, 72, Italian filmmaker, heart attack.
Xing Qiyi, 90, Chinese chemist.
Malcolm Ross, 91, Canadian literary critic, pneumonia.
Ross Wilson, 83, Canadian ice hockey trainer (Detroit Red Wings) and backup goalie.

5
Vinnette Justine Carroll, 80, American Broadway director (Don't Bother Me, I Can't Cope, Your Arms Too Short to Box with God).
Ansley J. Coale, 84, American demographer, senior research demographer at the Office of Population Research at Princeton.
Raymond F. Dasmann, 83, American biologist and environmental conservationist.
Marcel Dheere, 83, Canadian professional ice hockey player (Montreal Canadiens).
Billy Guy, 66, American singer.
Mushtaq Qadri, 35, Pakistani religious poet.
Arthur Winfree, 60, American theoretical biologist, known for his studies of biological oscillations.

6
Folke Frölén, 94, Swedish Olympic equestrian (equestrian at the 1952 Summer Olympics).
Brian James, 61, English cricketer.
Michel Majerus, 35, Luxembourgish artist, killed aboard Luxair Flight 9642.
Sid Sackson, 82, board game designer.
Gianluca Signorini, 42, Italian footballer, amyotrophic lateral sclerosis.

7
Rudolf Augstein, 79, German journalist and publisher, founder and chief editorialist of Der Spiegel.
Charles Hambro, Baron Hambro, 72, British merchant banker and political fundraiser.
Dilys Hamlett, 74, British actress.
Peg Phillips, 84, American actress (Northern Exposure), pulmonary disease.
Tom Reynolds, 84, Australian rules footballer.
Pedro Juan Soto, 74, Puerto Rican writer, killed by police officers.

8
Tom Barrington, 58, American professional football player (Ohio State, Washington Redskins, New Orleans Saints).
Norma Lee Clark, 75, American actress (Captain Video and His Video Rangers), author and personal assistant to Woody Allen.
Jaun Elia, 70, Pakistani Marxist.
Ivan Kandyba, 72, Ukrainian lawyer and dissident.
Ke Zhao, 92, Chinese mathematician.
Franjo Kukuljević, 93, Croatian tennis player.
Dorothy Mackie Low, 86, British novelist  under pseudonyms Dorothy Mackie Low, Lois Paxton, and Zoë Cass.
Querube Makalintal, 91, Filipino Chief Justice of the Supreme Court.
Zoé Oldenbourg, 86, Russian-born French historian and novelist.
Christopher Parsons, 70, English wildlife film-maker and producer.
Donald Niven Wheeler, 89, American social activist, teacher, and alleged Soviet spy.

9
Bill Baxter, 78, Scottish footballer.
Dick Johnson, 85, American test pilot.
Cliff Patton, 79, American professional football player (Philadelphia Eagles, Chicago Cardinals).
Merlin Santana, 26, American actor (The Steve Harvey Show, Getting By, The Cosby Show), shot.
William Schutz, 76, American psychologist.
Eusebio Tejera, 80, Uruguyan footballer.

10
Michel Boisrond, 81, French film director and screenwriter, known for directing Brigitte Bardot in Naughty Girl.
Steve Durbano, 50, Canadian ice hockey player, known for his rough play and larger-than-life persona (Pittsburgh Penguins, St. Louis Blues), lung cancer.
Franco Fantasia, 78, Italian actor.
Ron Jacobs, 74, English rugby union player.
Émile Ollivier, 62, Haitian-born Canadian writer.
Ken Raffensberger, 85, American baseball player (St. Louis Cardinals, Chicago Cubs, Philadelphia Phillies, Cincinnati Reds/Redlegs).
Gert Westphal, 82, German-Swiss actor, recitator and director.

11
Frances Ames, 82, South African neurologist, psychiatrist, and human rights activist, leukemia.
Sir Michael Clapham, 90, British industrialist, president of the Confederation of British Industry from 1972 to 1974.
Mary Hamilton, 67, African-American civil rights activist, ovarian cancer.
Bernard J. Liska, 71, American food scientist.
Esther Raziel-Naor, 90, Israeli Zionist, Irgun leader and politician.
Esther Somerfeld-Ziskind, 101, American neurologist and psychiatrist.
David Steel, 92, Scottish minister.
Marcia Van Dyke, 80, American violinist and actress.
Yoo Youngkuk, 86, Korean abstract artist.

12
Wally Barron, 90, American politician (26th governor of West Virginia), indicted and pleaded guilty to jury tampering.
David Francis Clyde, 77, British tropical physician, known for his research on malaria vaccines and chemotherapy.
Raoul Diagne, 92, French football player.
Glenn Dobbs, 82, American professional football player (Brooklyn Dodgers, Los Angeles Dons) and college football coach (University of Tulsa).
Tim Hector, 59, Antiguan political leader and cricket administrator, heart disease.
Lester Holtzman, 89, America jurist and politician.
Johannes Kerkorrel, 42, South African singer-songwriter, journalist and playwright, suicide by hanging.

13
Frederick Valentine Atkinson, 86, British mathematician (Atkinson's theorem, Atkinson–Wilcox theorem).
Bill Berry, 72, American jazz trumpeter (Duke Ellington Orchestra, Bill Berry and the L.A. Band).
Tom Caldwell, 81, Northern Ireland politician, unionist and interior designer, member of Parliament of Northern Ireland representing Belfast Willowfield.
Edwin Ferdon, 89, American ethnologist, known for his field work in Ecuador, Mexico, the South Pacific and the U.S. Southwest.
Roland Hanna, 70, American jazz pianist, composer, and teacher, viral infection.
Desmond Norman, 73, aircraft designer and aviation pioneer, heart attack.
Kaloji Narayana Rao, 88, Indian poet, freedom fighter, and political activist.
Irv Rubin, 57, Canadian chairman of the Jewish Defence League.
Juan Alberto Schiaffino, 77, Italian-Uruguayan football player.

14
Eddie Bracken, 87, American actor (Hail the Conquering Hero, The Miracle of Morgan's Creek, National Lampoon's Vacation).
Walter Crocker, 100, Australian diplomat, writer and war veteran.
James R. Hendrix, 77, US Army  sergeant and a recipient of the Medal of Honor, cancer.
Gourish Kaikini, 90, Indian litterateur, teacher and columnist.
Rosemary Forbes Kerry, 89, American nurse and social activist.
Gedong Bagus Oka, 81, Indonesian Hindu reformer and philosopher.
Dale E. Saffels, 81, American lawyer, legislator, and District Judge.
Mir Qazi, 38, Pakistani convicted criminal, executed by lethal injection in Virginia.

15
W. J. Burley, 88, British crime writer.
Ed Freed, 83, American baseball player (Philadelphia Phillies).
Sohn Kee-chung, 90, Korean olympic athlete and long-distance runner.
Terry Kendall, 55, New Zealand golfer, car fire.
Roberta Leighton, 70, American drag racer.
Mary Meigs, 85, American painter and writer.
JJ Stewart, 79, New Zealand rugby coach.
Earl L. Warrick, 91, American chemist, though disputed, claimed to be the inventor of Silly Putty.

16
Ramli Ahmad, 46, Malaysian Olympic sprinter (1976 Summer Olympics: men's 100 metres, men's 200 metres).
George Barrie, 90, American businessman (owner and CEO of  Fabergé Inc.) and songwriter (two-time nominee for Academy Award for Best Original Song).
Rupert E. Billingham, 81, British biologist, considered by many to have founded the fields of reproductive immunology and organ transplantation.
Tom Farris, 82, American professional football player (University of Wisconsin, Chicago Bears, Chicago Rockets).
Sir George Gardiner, 67, British politician.
Alfred Lewis Levitt, 86, American film and television screenwriter, heart failure.
Frank Smithies, 90, British mathematician.
Mose Vinson, 85, American boogie-woogie, blues and jazz pianist and singer, diabetes.

17
Maria Bogner, German fashion designer.
Robert Brattain, 91, American physicist.
Abba Eban, 88, Israeli Foreign Affairs Minister, ambassador to the U.S., ambassador to the U.N.
Frank McCarthy, 78, American artist and painter, lung cancer.
Marvin Mirisch, 84, American film producer, cancer.

18
Angus Cameron, 93, American book editor and publisher, known for being blacklisted during McCarthy era.
James Coburn, 74, American actor (The Magnificent Seven, The Great Escape, Affliction), Oscar winner (1999), heart attack.
Francesco De Martino, 95, Italian jurist and politician, considered to be the conscience of the Italian Socialist Party.
Kim Gallagher, 38, American middle-distance runner, stroke.
Peter Grippe, 90, American sculptor, printmaker, and painter.
Edith Hirsch Luchins, 80, Polish-American mathematician.
Pete Orr, 46, American stock car racing driver, cancer.
Pasquale Vivolo, 74, Italian footballer.
Juliusz Wyrzykowski, 56, Polish movie and stage actor.

19
John Bunting, 75, English sculptor and teacher.
Vito Ciancimino, 78, Italian politician (mayor of Palermo, Sicily) and Mafia member, made a fortune from bribery and embezzlement.
George Fullerton, 79, South African cricketer.
Prince Alexandre de Merode, 68, Belgian International Olympic Committee member, lung cancer.
Jean-Claude Renard, 80, French poet.
Harry Watson, 79, Canadian professional hockey player (Detroit Red Wings, Toronto Maple Leafs, Chicago Black Hawks).

20
Billy Goelz, 84, American professional wrestler, booker and trainer.
George Guest, 78, British organist and choirmaster.
Ben Webb, 45, Canadian journalist, editor of Sanity, the Campaign for Nuclear Disarmament.
Margita White, 65, American White House press official under Richard M. Nixon and Gerald R. Ford.
Zhang Shuguang, 82, Chinese politician.

21
Robert Brentano, 76, American history professor, prize-winning author and historian of medieval England and Italy.
Hadda Brooks, 86, American jazz singer, pianist and composer, known as the "Queen of the Boogie".
Amílcar de Castro, 82, Brazilian sculptor, known for works in iron.
George Emslie, Baron Emslie, 82, Scottish judge and life peer.
Arturo Guzman Decena, founder of Los Zetas.
Buddy Kaye, 84, American songwriter, producer, and author.
J. Roger Pichette, 81, Canadian politician.
Prince Takamado, 47, Japanese prince.

22
Parley Baer, 88, American radio, television and film actor (The Andy Griffith Show, The Adventures of Ozzie and Harriet, The Addams Family).
Joan Barclay, 88, American actress.
Norman Clarke, 86, British physicist and politician.
Christine Marion Fraser, 64, Scottish novelist.
Rafał Gan-Ganowicz, 70, Polish mercenary, journalist, and social activist.
Iain Hook, British aid worker, shot by Israel Defense Forces sniper.
Adele Jergens, 84, American actress.
Infanta Beatriz of Spain, 93, Spanish noblewoman and daughter of King Alfonso XIII.
Govindbhai Shroff, 91, Indian activist.

23
Erna Bogen-Bogáti, 95, Hungarian Olympic fencer (1928 women's foil, 1932 bronze medal women's foil, 1936 women's foil).
Boudewijn Büch, 53, Dutch writer, poet and television presenter.
Maritie Carpentier, 79, French television show producer.
Roberto Matta, 91 Chilean artist.
Billy Travis, 41, American professional wrestler.

24
Branko Dangubić, 80, Yugoslavian (Serbian) Olympic javelin thrower (men's javelin throw at the 1952 Summer Olympics).
Noel Davis, 75, English film and television actor and casting director (Merlin, Reds).
Mikhail Devyatayev, 85, Soviet fighter pilot who escaped from a Nazi concentration camp.
Harriet Doerr, 92, American author.
Cecil Dowdy, 57, American college football player (University of Alabama) and businessman, hunting accident.
Kazım Ergin, 87, Turkish geophysicist.
Lewis Samuel Feuer, 89, American sociologist, philosopher, professor and author.
Richard Lazarus, 80, American psychologist.
Philip B. Meggs, 60, American graphic designer.
John Rawls, 81, American moral and political philosopher.
Baba Sidhaye, 70, Indian cricketer.
John Tosi, 88, American football player.
Sidney S. Wade, 93, American major general in the U.S. Marine Corps.

25
Ed Bliss, 90, American broadcast journalist, news editor and educator (Edward R. Murrow, Walter Cronkite).
Charles E. Chamberlain, 85, American politician (U.S. Representative for Michigan's 6th congressional district).
Gordon Davidson, 87, Australian politician (member of Australian Senate representing South Australia).
David Drummond, 8th Earl of Perth, 95, British politician and aristocrat.
Karel Reisz, 76, British film director (The French Lieutenant's Woman, Saturday Night and Sunday Morning, The Gambler).
Eugene V. Rostow, 89, American legal scholar and public servant.

26
Frank Allaun, 89, British politician (member of Parliament for Salford East from 1955 to 1983).
Jim Butterfield, 74, American head football coach at Ithaca College (three NCAA Division III Football Championships).
Ruzha Delcheva, 87, Bulgarian actress.
Ralph Engelstad, 72, American casino executive (Imperial Palace).
Raymond Gafner, 87, Swiss ice hockey player and referee.
Ernest Leiser, 81, American television producer.
Isabel McLaughlin, 99, Canadian painter and philanthropist.
Raymond L. Wallace, 84, American Bigfoot hoaxer.
Verne Winchell, 87, American business executive, founder of Winchell's Donuts, president and CEO of Denny's.

27
Billie Bird, 94, American actress (Sixteen Candles, Ernest Saves Christmas, Home Alone, Dennis the Menace).
Stanley Black, 89, English bandleader, composer, conductor and pianist.
Laurence J. Burton, 76, American politician (U.S. Representative for Utah's 1st congressional district).
George Christian, 75, American journalist, White House press secretary for President Lyndon B. Johnson.
Ronald Gerard Connors, 87, American Roman Catholic bishop in the Dominican Republic.
Bob deLauer, 82, American professional football player (USC, Cleveland/Los Angeles Rams).
Edwin L. Mechem, 90, American politician.
Yeruham Meshel, 90, Israeli union leader and politician.
Robert W. Straub, 82, American politician, Alzheimer's disease.
Shivmangal Singh Suman, 87, Indian poet, heart attack.

28
Mahicon Librelato, 21, Brazilian footballer, traffic accident.
Russell Arthur Missin, 80, British organist.
Lennaert Nijgh, 57, Dutch lyricist, gastrointestinal bleeding.
Billy Pearson, American jockey, film actor, and an art dealer.
Dave "Snaker" Ray, 59, American blues singer and guitarist, lung cancer.

29
Melih Cevdet Anday, 87, Turkish author.
Damien Covington, 29, American professional football player (Buffalo Bills), killed in an attempted robbery.
Saburō Ienaga, 89, Japanese historian.
John Justin, 85, British stage and film actor.
David Weiss, 93, American novelist (Naked Came I).

30
Alan Ashman, 74, English footballer player.
Jeffrey Baldwin, 5, Canadian child who was mistreated by his grandparents, septic shock.
Minuetta Kessler, 88, Russian-born American concert pianist and composer.
Bill Sparks, 80, British Royal Marine Commando in World War II.
Tim Woods, 68, professional wrestler known as Mr. Wrestling, heart attack.
Howard Goodman, 81, American Southern Gospel singer Happy Goodman Family.

References 

2002-11
 11